Leif Mortensen (born 5 May 1946) is a former Danish professional road bicycle racer. He won a silver medal in the individual road race at the 1968 Summer Olympics while finishing fourth in the team time trial. In 1970–1975 he rode professionally with the following achievements.

Palmarès 

 1967
 2nd, World Road Championships, 100 km TTT
 1968
 2nd, Olympic Games, Road race, Mexico City
 1969
 2nd, World Road Championships, 100 km TTT
 1st, World Road Championships, Amateur road race, Brno
 1970
 2nd, World Road Championships, Professional road race, Leicester
 1971
 1st, Hellemmes
 1st, Trofeo Baracchi (with Luis Ocaña)
 6th, Overall, Tour de France
 1972
 1st, Le Quillo
 1973
 1st, GP Aix-en-Provence
 1st, Stage 5, Paris–Nice, Manosque
 1st, Overall, Tour of Belgium
 1st, Stage 5b, Nivelles

References

1946 births
Living people
Cyclists at the 1968 Summer Olympics
Danish male cyclists
Olympic cyclists of Denmark
Olympic silver medalists for Denmark
UCI Road World Champions (elite men)
Olympic medalists in cycling
Cyclists from Copenhagen
Medalists at the 1968 Summer Olympics